Portland NORML is the National Organization for the Reform of Marijuana Laws (NORML) affiliate for Portland, Oregon, in the United States. The chapter was established in January 2015 by Portland-based radio host and cannabis activist Russ Belville. Scott Gordon serves as its executive director.

In 2015, Portland NORML organized the Burnside Burn in celebration of the legalization of recreational marijuana use in Oregon.

In 2016, Portland NORML treasurer, Randy Quast was appointed interim director of national NORML, replacing outgoing director Allen St. Pierre.

References

External links
 

Cannabis in Oregon
Cannabis organizations
National Organization for the Reform of Marijuana Laws
Organizations based in Portland, Oregon